Dale Maurice Richards (born 16 July 1976) is a West Indian international cricketer who plays first class cricket for Barbados.

A right-handed batsman, Richards debuted in 1999/2000. His highest first class score of 159 was made against Jamaica in the Carib Beer Series of 2006/07.

Richards was called up for the West Indies' tour of England in 2009 but although he featured in two warm-up matches, he was forced to return home with a shoulder injury.

He subsequently made his Test debut against Bangladesh when a number of West Indian players made themselves unavailable. He played both Tests, scoring 108 runs with a top score of 69.

He then played the first two One Day Internationals against Bangladesh and two matches during the West Indies' 2009 ICC Champions Trophy campaign before being called up to the West Indies squad for the second ODI against South Africa in 2010.

References
Cricinfo Profile
CricketArchive Profile

References

1976 births
Living people
West Indies Test cricketers
West Indies One Day International cricketers
West Indies Twenty20 International cricketers
Barbados cricketers
Barbadian cricketers